Rick Lenz (born November 21, 1939, Springfield, Illinois) is an American actor, author and playwright. Lenz is known for his performances in the films Cactus Flower (1969), The Shootist (1976), and Melvin and Howard (1980).

Early career
Lenz directed the Jackson, Michigan Civic Theater for two years before relocating to New York to seek work as an actor. In 1965 he  made his Broadway debut in Mating Dance, starring Van Johnson. Though the  show closed opening night, stage impresario David Merrick was in the audience, and soon afterward cast Lenz in the Broadway hit Cactus Flower as understudy for the juvenile lead role, Igor Sullivan. Lenz later took over the role and played it for a year. Film producer Mike Frankovich and Walter Matthau saw him in the part and cast him as Igor in the film version, with Goldie Hawn.

In the 1970s, Rick Lenz appeared in several Hollywood movies, including How Do I Love Thee? (1970), Scandalous John (1971), Where Does It Hurt? (1972), The Shootist (1976), The Little Dragons (1980) and Melvin and Howard (1980).

Filmography

Film

Television

Theatre

Personal life
As of 2017, Lenz resides in Los Angeles with his spouse, Linda; the couple married in May 1982. He has three children; sons Scott and Charlie, and daughter, Abigail.

References

External links
  Archived from the original on January 28, 2019.
 

1939 births
American male film actors
American male stage actors
American male television actors
20th-century American dramatists and playwrights
20th-century American memoirists
Living people
Male actors from Illinois
New York University alumni
People from Springfield, Illinois
University of Michigan alumni